The German track and field badge (German:Mehrkampfabzeichen) is a sports badge awarded by the German Athletics Organization.

Requirements
The award ia available in three classes (bronze, silver and gold) depending on the score. 

Furthermore, it is possible to compete in either triathlon, pentathlon or decathlon.

Triathlon
 100m sprint
 Long jump
 Shot-put

Pentathlon
 long jump
 Javelin throw
 Ball throw
 Discus throw
 1500m walk

Decathlon
 100 metres
 Long jump
 Shot put
 High jump
 400 metres
 110 metres hurdles
 Discus throw
 Pole vault
 Javelin throw
 1500 metres

See also
 German Sports Badge

External links
 document in German 
 Score calculator in German
 Data

track and field badge